The 1999 Nigerian Senate election in Adamawa State was held on February 20, 1999, to elect members of the Nigerian Senate to represent Adamawa State. Abubakar Girei representing Adamawa North, Iya Abubakar representing Adamawa Central and Jonathan Zwingina representing Adamawa South all won on the platform of the Peoples Democratic Party.

Overview

Summary

Results

Adamawa North 
The election was won by Abubakar Girei of the Peoples Democratic Party.

Adamawa Central 
The election was won by Iya Abubakar of the Peoples Democratic Party.

Adamawa South 
The election was won by Jonathan Zwingina of the Peoples Democratic Party.

References 

Ada
Ada
Adamawa State Senate elections